The Selous thicket rat (Grammomys selousi) is a species of rodent endemic to Tanzania.

References

Endemic fauna of Tanzania
Grammomys
Mammals described in 2011